USS Renshaw may refer to the following ships of the United States Navy:

 , a schooner, captured in 1862 and sold in 1865.

United States Navy ship names